The 2017 Montana State Bobcats football team represented Montana State University as a member of the Big Sky Conference during the 2017 NCAA Division I FCS football season. Led by second-year head coach Jeff Choate, Montana State compiled an overall record of 5–6 with a mark of 5–3 in conference play, tying for sixth place in the Big Sky. The Bobcats played their home games at Bobcat Stadium in Bozeman, Montana.

Schedule

Game summaries

at Washington State

South Dakota State

at North Dakota

Weber State

Portland State

at Eastern Washington

at Northern Colorado

Idaho State

Kennesaw State

at Northern Arizona

Montana

References

Montana State
Montana State Bobcats football seasons
Montana State Bobcats football